Difemetorex (INN; sold as Cleofil), also known as diphemethoxidine, is a stimulant drug of the piperidine class which was used as an appetite suppressant, but produced intolerable side effects such as insomnia which limited its clinical use. It was introduced in France by Ciba-Geigy in 1966 but is now no longer marketed.

Synthesis

Alkylation of desoxypipradrol with ethyleneoxide gives difemetorex.

See also 
 Desoxypipradrol
 Diphenylprolinol
 SCH-5472

References 

Primary alcohols
Anorectics
Norepinephrine–dopamine reuptake inhibitors
2-Benzylpiperidines
Stimulants
Abandoned drugs